Goliath Awaits is a 1981 American made-for-television action adventure science fiction thriller film originally broadcast in two parts in November 1981 on various stations as a part of Operation Prime Time's syndicated programming. It is about an ocean liner sunk by a German U-boat in 1939 whose wreck is discovered in 1981, with over 300 survivors and their descendants living in an air bubble inside the ship.

Plot
On September 4, 1939, the British ocean liner RMS Goliath, carrying 1,860 passengers, is torpedoed by a German U-boat and sinks within minutes while on a transatlantic crossing to the United States three days after the outbreak of war.

Scientists aboard a research ship in 1981 discover the wreck of the Goliath lying upright in 1,000 feet (305 m) of water, and divers are sent down to investigate the wreck. Oceanographer Peter Cabot (Mark Harmon) hears systematic banging and music coming from the ship and is shocked to see the face of a beautiful young woman (Emma Samms) inside a porthole. Cabot and his colleagues discover 337 people, survivors and their descendants, living in an air bubble in the wreck caused by the vessel's having slowly sunk in relatively shallow water. The residents of Goliath, who have invented some technologies to help them survive, some not even known to the outside modern world, live in a superficially utopian society under the autocratic leadership of John McKenzie (Christopher Lee), a junior officer at the time of the sinking credited with saving a sizable number of passengers and crew. The scientists are surprised to discover that McKenzie and some of the ship's residents are not at all interested in being "rescued", and that there are outcasts and rebels opposed to McKenzie's seemingly beneficent leadership, which also includes brutal discipline, mandatory contraception, euthanasia, and outright murder disguised as a mysterious disease.

Complicating things, the Goliath had been carrying some sensitive documents to President Roosevelt. A joint American/British military team is sent by Admiral Wiley Sloan (Eddie Albert) to retrieve and destroy the documents.

Principal cast
 Mark Harmon as Peter Cabot
 Christopher Lee as John McKenzie
 Eddie Albert as Admiral Wiley Sloan
 John Carradine as Ronald Bentley
 Alex Cord as Dr. Sam Marlowe
 Robert Forster as Commander Jeff Selkirk
 Frank Gorshin as Dan Wesker
 Jean Marsh as Dr. Goldman
 John McIntire as Senator Oliver Bartholemew
 Jeanette Nolan as Mrs. Bartholomew
 Duncan Regehr as Paul Ryker
 Emma Samms as Lea McKenzie
 Kirk Cameron as Liam
 Lori Lethin as Maria
 John Ratzenberger as Bill Sweeney

Filming
The interiors of Goliath were principally filmed on location aboard the RMS Queen Mary in California.

References

External links
 
 

1981 television films
1981 films
1980s action thriller films
1980s adventure films
Action television films
American thriller television films
Adventure television films
American disaster films
Films directed by Kevin Connor
Films scored by George Duning
Seafaring films
Operation Prime Time
1980s American films